General is a brand of air conditioners owned by Fujitsu General Limited of Japan. Fujitsu General manufactures and markets various air conditioning units and humidity control solutions under the General and Fujitsu brands in different markets.

Former Australian Cricketer Mark "Tubby" Taylor has been the face of Fujitsu General Air conditioners in Australia since 1998.

India
In India, General air conditioners were manufactured and marketed by ETA General Pvt. Ltd, which was a joint venture between Fujitsu General Limited and the ETA-Ascon group based in Dubai. The company is headquartered in Chennai. It has another manufacturing unit in Thailand.
The company has ended its long-standing joint venture agreement with the Dubai-based ETA group and henceforth will operate under a wholly owned subsidiary Fujitsu General (India) Pvt Ltd, which was earlier known as ETA General.

References 

Heating, ventilation, and air conditioning companies
Manufacturing companies based in Chennai
Japanese brands
Fujitsu subsidiaries